Wilmington Council may be:

District Council of Wilmington
Wilmington Council (Delaware)
Wilmington Council (North Carolina)